Michael Domenec, DD, C.M. (1816–1878) full name Miquel Joan Josep Domènech i Veciana, was a Spanish prelate of the Roman Catholic Church.  He served as the second bishop of the Diocese of Pittsburgh in Pennsylvania from 1860 to 1876 and as the only bishop of the short-lived Diocese of Allegheny in Pennsylvania from 1876 to 1877.

Biography

Early life 
Michael Domenec was born on December 27, 1816, and baptized the same day at the parish church of Saint Peter in Reus, near Tarragona, Spain. His parents, Josep Domènech and Tecla Viciana, were of a wealthy family of high social standing. (American sources spell the family name "Domenec.") His early education was received at Madrid.

The outbreak of the Carlist War interrupted Domenec's studies; when he was age fifteen, his family fled Spain for political reasons. They moved to France, where Domenec studied at the College of Montolieu in Aude, where he joined the Congregation of the Mission, also known as the Vincentians or Lazarites. He lived at their motherhouse in Paris until 1838.

In Paris, Domenec met Father John Timon, the visitor general of the Vincentians in the United States. At Timon's invitation, Domenec joined the American mission, arriving at St. Mary's of the Barrens, a seminary in Perryville, Missouri. Domenec became fluent in English and acquired a reputation as an orator.

Priesthood 
Domenec was ordained for the Vincentians by Bishop Joseph Rosati to the priesthood on June 30, 1839. Having acted as professor at St. Mary's seminary, and at the same time serving as a missionary in Missouri, he was sent in 1845 to help operated St. Vincent's Seminary at Philadelphia. He was also appointed pastor of St. Stephen's Parish in Nicetown, Pennsylvania, and later of St. Vincent de Paul Parish in Germantown, Pennsylvania.

Bishop of Pittsburgh 
On September 28, 1860, Domenec was appointed by Pope Pius IX as the second bishop of the Diocese of Pittsburgh. Domenec was consecrated  in Saint Paul's Cathedral by Archbishop Francis Kenrick on December 9, 1860.

Domenec found the diocese in good order: "well-supplied with priests and churches, and finely equipped institutions". However, even though Domenec was opposed to debt, he was unable to deal successfully with financial involvements—the panic of 1873 was a fiscal disaster for the Pittsburgh diocese. In the period after the American Civil War, when debts should have been paid off instead of more incurred, improvements upon the cathedral and the building of churches, convents, and schools had rolled up heavy obligations which the diocese could no longer meet.

Domenec visited Rome several times—he was present at the invitation of Pius IX at the canonization of the Japanese martyrs in 1862, and as a council father at the First Vatican Council in 1869.

Bishop of Allegheny 

The growth of Diocese of Pittsburgh prompted the Vatican in 1875 to erect another diocese to support the Catholic population. The Diocese of Allegheny was split off from the Diocese Pittsburgh on January 11, 1876, and Pius IX appointed Domenec as its first bishop. This division was an unpopular decision in the Diocese of Pittsburgh, as it saddled the diocese with the most debt-ridden institutions.

Domenec traveled to Rome in early 1877 to advocate for the Diocese of Pittsburgh. Pius IX then reversed his previous decision and the two dioceses were reunited.  Domenec then resigned as bishop of the Diocese of Allegheny.

Resignation and legacy 
While awaiting a new assignment from the Vatican, Domenec travelled to Barcelona in the fall of 1877 to preach in the churches there. After catching pneumonia at Tarragona, Michael Domenec died there on January 7, 1878. He is entombed in the Cathedral of Tarragona.

Notes

Many sources on Domenec's life spell Reus as "Ruez"; at least one correctly spells the city's name. His full name and the names of his parents are recorded in the parish's baptismal records (Book 20, Folio 109, 27 December 1816).

Sources

References

Bibliography
 

1816 births
1878 deaths
People from Reus
Vincentians
Spanish Roman Catholic missionaries
Roman Catholic bishops of Pittsburgh
Spanish Roman Catholic bishops in North America
Vincentian bishops
19th-century Roman Catholic bishops in the United States
Spanish expatriates in the United States